The Pentax K-30 is a 16.3-megapixel Pentax digital single-lens reflex camera, announced on 21 May 2012. At its introduction, it was in the middle of Pentax's DSLR range, above the now-discontinued entry-level K-r, and below the semi-pro K-5 and successor K-5 II.

Overview
It has a stainless steel chassis, and unlike most DSLRs of its class, is fully weather sealed. It can shoot continuously at up to 6 frames per second with a maximum shutter speed of 1/6000th of a second. It can capture video at 1080p at either 30, 25, or 24 fps. Like all current and recent Pentax dSLRs it features in-body shake reduction, removing the need for each lens to have image stabilisation. The Pentax K mount allows use of legacy lenses dating back to the 1970s, or even earlier with an M42-mount adapter, for which the K-mount is fully compatible. The autofocus system (SAFOX IXi+) is an advance over the K-5 and features 11 AF points, 9 of which are cross-type (i.e. sensitive to vertical as well as horizontal edges). For maximum flexibility, the camera can either use the proprietary supplied lithium battery, or, with an optional adapter, use the universally available AA battery type.

References

External links

Pentax K-30 - Pentax US
Pentax K-30 - Pentax UK

Notable reviews:
Pentax K-30 Camera Review - Pentax Forums
Pentax K-30 review: A good camera doesn't have to be fragile by the Verge
Pentax K-30 Review by dpreview.com
Pentax K-30: Weather-resistant warrior by Pocket-lint
Pentax K-30 review by Imaging Resource
Pentax K-30 Review: Tough Body, Sensitive Soul by Gizmdo
Pentax K-30 review by CNET Australia
Pentax K-30 review by ITProPortal.com

K-30
Live-preview digital cameras
Cameras introduced in 2012
Pentax K-mount cameras